Debabrata Mukherjee (born 20 January 1962) is an Indian mountaineer and explorer from West Bengal. He was the oldest, first civilian Indian to climb Mount Everest from the North Col. He is also the first person to cross Chaukhamba Col from Badrinath to reach Gangotri.

On top of Mount Everest 
Debabrata Mukherjee climbed the North-Col and NE Ridge with Biplob Vaidya on 25 May 2014, and set foot on the summit of Mount Everest at 8:46 am.He was the team leader of this expedition.  The same day Malavath Purna the youngest Indian and the youngest female in the world to have reached the summit of Mount Everest.

Mountaineering Expedition 
Mukherjee climbed Mt.Saife in 1986

Kamet 1988

Mount Yunam in 2005 as a Team leader and successful climber

Uja Tirche in 2005 as a Team leader and successful climber (new route)

Mount Karcha as a Team leader and successful climber 2008

Mount K. R. V East Face as a Team leader 2013

Mount Everest Oldest person to climb successfully from North-Col in 2014

Mount Jalung Ri and Mount Chomo Ri  (First ascent) as a Liaison Officer with a Japanese team and a successful climber 2015

Bhagirathi Parbat III as a Team leader and successful climber first Indian ascent from North ridge
Indian Mountaineering Foundation - Pathayatra 2015

Mount Blanc oldest Indian to climbed the peak Successfully in 2016.

Significant exploration 
 The first person to cross the Panpatia Glacier in 2006. In 2009 he found a new trekking route from Kedarnath to Badrinath. To find this path, he crossed the Gandharpangi forest, Panpatia and Satopanth glaciers.  In 2013 On the way from Badrinath to Gangotri,  he crossed the Chaukhamba col with a new route.

Bibliography and travel stories 
 Natur i Sydasien (In Swedish)

Awards 
 Jagadish Nanavati Award from Himalayan Club (2013)

Gallery

See also
Indian summiters of Mount Everest - Year wise
List of Mount Everest summiters by number of times to the summit
List of Mount Everest records of India
List of Mount Everest records

References 

Indian summiters of Mount Everest
Indian mountain climbers
Bengali sportspeople
1962 births
Living people